The 2013 World Wheelchair Curling Championship was held from February 16 to 23 at the Sochi Olympic Curling Centre in Sochi, Russia. Canada won their third title after defeating Sweden in the final with a score of 4–3, becoming the first nation to win three world wheelchair curling titles.

Qualification
 (host country)
Top seven teams from the 2012 World Wheelchair Curling Championship:

Two teams from the 2013 WWhCC Qualification Event

Qualification event

Norway and Finland qualified from the qualifying event held in November 2012 in Lohja, Finland.

Teams
The teams are listed as follows:

Round-robin standings
Final round-robin standings

Round-robin results
All draw times are listed in Moscow Time (UTC+4).

Draw 1
Saturday, February 16, 9:30

Draw 2
Saturday, February 16, 16:00

Draw 3
Sunday, February 17, 9:30

Draw 4
Sunday, February 17, 15:30

Draw 4 was postponed due to ice problems. The scheduled United States – South Korea game was moved to Draw 10, while the scheduled China – Norway and Slovakia – Sweden games were moved to Draw 11.

Draw 5
Monday, February 18, 9:30

Draw 6
Monday, February 18, 15:30

Draw 7
Tuesday, February 19, 9:30

Draw 8
Tuesday, February 19, 15:30

Draw 9
Wednesday, February 20, 9:30

Draw 10
Wednesday, February 20, 15:30

Draw 11
Wednesday, February 20, 19:30

Draw 12
Thursday, February 21, 9:00

Draw 13
Thursday, February 21, 14:30

Placement Game
Thursday, February 21, 20:00

Tiebreakers
Thursday, February 21, 20:00

Friday, February 22, 9:00

Playoffs

1 vs. 2
Friday, February 22, 14:30

3 vs. 4
Friday, February 22, 14:30

Semifinal
Friday, February 22, 20:00

Bronze medal game
Saturday, February 23, 9:30

Gold medal game
Saturday, February 23, 15:30

References

External links

World Wheelchair Curling Championship
World Wheelchair Curling Championship
International curling competitions hosted by Russia
World Wheelchair Curling Championship
Wheelchair Curling